Jaque de Dampierre was a thirteenth-century trouvère, possibly from Dampierre-en-Yvelines. He was of the later generation of trouvères. His two works, Cors de si gentil faiture and D'amours naist fruis vertueus, are found in a single manuscript. They both use bar form and the plagal mode.

References
Karp, Theodore. "Jaque de Dampierre." Grove Music Online. Oxford Music Online. Accessed 20 September 2008.

Trouvères
Male classical composers
Year of birth unknown
Year of death unknown